My Kind of Blues is the seventh studio album by American singer-songwriter Sam Cooke. Record producer by Hugo & Luigi, the album was released in October 1961 in the United States by RCA Victor.

The album was remastered in 2011 as a part of The RCA Albums Collection.

Track listing
All songs arranged and conducted by Sammy Lowe.

Side one 
 "Don't Get Around Much Anymore" (Bob Russell, Duke Ellington) – 3:10
 "Little Girl Blue" (Richard Rodgers, Lorenz Hart) – 2:55
 "Nobody Knows You When You're Down and Out" (Jimmy Cox) – 3:20
 "Out in the Cold Again" (Ted Koehler, Rube Bloom) – 2:25
 "But Not for Me" (George Gershwin, Ira Gershwin) – 2:29
 "Exactly Like You" (Dorothy Fields, Jimmy McHugh) – 2:05

Side two
 "I'm Just a Lucky So and So" (Duke Ellington, Mack David) – 3:10
 "Since I Met You Baby" (Ivory Joe Hunter) – 3:00
 "Baby, Won't You Please Come Home" (Charles Warfield, Clarence Williams) – 2:08
 "Trouble in Mind" (Richard M. Jones) – 2:55
 "You're Always on My Mind" (James W. Alexander) – 2:12
 "The Song Is Ended" (Irving Berlin) – 2:07

Personnel
All credits adapted from The RCA Albums Collection (2011) liner notes.
Sam Cooke – vocals
Clifton White, Everett Barksdale – guitar
George Duvivier, Lloyd Trotman – bass guitar
Panama Francis – drums
Morris Wechsler, Ernest Hayes – piano
Toots Mondello, Reuben Phillips, Seldon Powell, Melvin Tax, Jerome Richardson – saxophone
Ray Copeland, Steve Lipkins, Lou Oles, Joseph Wilder, John Grimes – trumpet
Larry Altpeter, Albert Godlis, Frank Saracco, Eddie Bert – trombone
Sammy Lowe – conductor
Bob Simpson – recording engineer

Notes

External links 
 

1961 albums
Sam Cooke albums
Albums conducted by Sammy Lowe
Albums produced by Hugo & Luigi
RCA Victor albums